Olga Nikolaevna of Russia (11 September 1822 – 30 October 1892) was a member of the Russian imperial family who by marriage to Charles I of Württemberg became Queen consort of the Kingdom of Württemberg until Charles' death.

She was the second daughter of Nicholas I of Russia and Charlotte of Prussia. She was thus a sister of Alexander II of Russia. She married King Charles of Württemberg, with whom she had no children.

Early life

Grand Duchess Olga of Russia was born on 11 September 1822 in St. Petersburg, Russia. Her father was Emperor Nicholas I of Russia, the son of Emperor Paul I of Russia and Empress Maria Feodorovna of Russia (née Duchess Sophia Dorothea of Württemberg). Her mother was Empress Alexandra of Russia (née Princess Charlotte of Prussia), the daughter of King Frederick William III of Prussia and Queen Louise of Prussia (née Duchess Louise of Mecklenburg-Strelitz).

Olga grew up as part of a close family of seven sisters and brothers. She had two elder siblings: Emperor Alexander II of Russia and Grand Duchess Maria of Russia; and four younger siblings: Grand Duchess Alexandra of Russia, Grand Duke Constantine of Russia, Grand Duke Nicholas of Russia and Grand Duke Michael of Russia.

Attractive, cultured and intelligent, she was considered to be one of the most eligible princesses in Europe. She spoke several languages, and was fond of music and painting.

Marriage

Olga met Kronprinz Karl of Württemberg in early 1846 in Palermo, Two Sicilies. Her parents wished that she make a dynastic marriage, especially since her siblings Alexander, Maria and Alexandra had married relatively insignificant royal partners. There had already been several marriages between members of the Russian Imperial Family and members of the Württemberg Royal Family (in addition to the marriage between Olga's paternal grandparents): Olga's future father-in-law, King Wilhelm I of Württemberg, married Olga's paternal aunt, Grand Duchess Catherine of Russia; Olga's paternal uncle, Grand Duke Michael of Russia, married Wilhelm I's niece, Princess Charlotte of Württemberg.

Olga gave her consent to Karl's proposal of marriage after only a few meetings, on 18 January. The wedding was held in great splendour on 13 July 1846 at the Peterhof Palace, Russia. The couple came back from Russia to the Kingdom of Württemberg on 23 September. They lived mostly in the Villa Berg in Stuttgart and in the Kloster Hofen in Friedrichshafen.

The couple had no children, probably not because of Karl's homosexuality, which he lived openly in his later age, but of his other health problems. Olga's husband became the object of scandal several times for his closeness with various men. The most notorious of these was Charles Woodcock from the United States, a former chamberlain whom Karl elevated to being Freiherr Woodcock-Savage (English: Baron Woodcock-Savage) in 1888. The resulting outcry forced Karl to renounce his favourite. In 1863, Olga and Karl adopted Olga's niece, Grand Duchess Vera of Russia, the daughter of Olga's brother Grand Duke Constantine.

On 25 June 1864, after the death of his father, Karl acceded the throne and became the third King of Württemberg, making Olga the fourth Queen of Württemberg. The new King was enthroned on 12 July 1864.

Work and influence

Olga dedicated her life to social causes. She was especially interested in the education of girls, and also supported wounded veterans and the disabled assisted in part by philanthropist Charlotte Wahl of Stuttgart. A children's hospital of Stuttgart, the Olgahospital, was named for her in 1849; and an order of Protestant nursing nuns of Stuttgart, the Olgaschwesternschaft, was named for her in 1872. These charitable enterprises made her very popular among her subjects, much more so than her husband.

Olga was fond of agriculture and was keenly interested in all happenings on her farming estate which was located in the German Volhynia colony of Russia.  She received detailed reports from her ward Karl Alexander Wieler, a Württemberg orphan, who managed her estate and would rise to prominence in Russia's Imperial government owing to this Imperial association.

Olga was also very interested in natural science and collected minerals systematically. Her collection was left to the Staatliche Museum für Naturkunde in Stuttgart. As of 2011 part of the collection is still on display. Her name is attached to a geological formation in the Northern Territory, Australia. In 1871, King Karl I elevated the German-born Australian explorer Ferdinand Mueller to being "Freiherr von Mueller". He repaid the compliment as follows. A series of massive rock formations was discovered by the British-born Australian explorer Ernest Giles in central Australia in 1872. Mueller was Giles' benefactor. Giles had wanted to name the tallest peak Mt. Mueller, but Mueller prevailed on Giles to name it Mt. Olga, in honour of the queen. The entire geological formation then became known as "The Olgas", before the indigenous name "Kata Tjuta" was officially proclaimed in the 1980s.

Later life
Queen Olga was noted for her dignity and queenly demeanor.  On a visit by the royal couple to Austria-Hungary in July, 1873, a lady-in-waiting to Empress Elisabeth of Austria noted, "He is most insignificant.  She makes a most imposing appearance ... the only one who is a queen ..."

In 1881, Olga wrote a memoir called Traum der Jugend goldener Stern (translated as The Golden Dream of My Youth) which described her childhood at the Russian Imperial Court, her grief at the loss of her sister Alexandra, and her early adult life, ending with her wedding to Karl. It is dedicated to her nieces, Grand Duchess Olga of Russia and Grand Duchess Vera of Russia.

When her husband died on 6 October 1891, Olga became queen dowager. She died one year later, on 30 October 1892, in Friedrichshafen, aged 70. She was buried in the crypt of the Altes Schloss (Old Castle) in Stuttgart.

Honours
: Dame of the Order of Queen Saint Isabel, 28 June 1865
 : Dame of the Order of Olga, 1871

Ancestry

References

Further reading
Traum der Jugend goldner Stern. Aus den Aufzeichnungen der Königin Olga von Württemberg by Sophie Dorothee Podewils, Günther Neske Verlag, 1955.
Königin Olga von Württemberg. Historischer Roman by Jetta Sachs-Collignon, Stieglitz-Verlag, 1991.
Die württembergischen Königinnen. Charlotte Mathilde, Katharina, Pauline, Olga, Charlotte – ihr Leben und Wirken by Sabine Thomsen, Silberburg-Verlag, 2006.
Road to Ekaterinburg: Nicholas and Alexandra's daughters 1913-1918 by ECS Banks, published by SilverWood Books, 2013.
Road to Ekaterinburg from Amazon Marketplace
Road to Ekaterinburg Kindle Edition UK
Road to Ekaterinburg Kindle Edition US

External links
Koenigreich-Wuerttemberg.de

1822 births
1892 deaths
Russian grand duchesses
House of Holstein-Gottorp-Romanov
Crown Princesses of Württemberg
Queens consort of Württemberg
Princesses of Württemberg
Memoirists from the Russian Empire
19th-century writers from the Russian Empire
19th-century women writers from the Russian Empire
Dames of the Order of Saint Isabel
Daughters of Russian emperors
Children of Nicholas I of Russia